Hajji Dela (also Romanized as Ḩājjī Delā and Ḩajī Delā; also known as Haji Delak) is a village in Larijan-e Sofla Rural District, Larijan District, Amol County, Mazandaran Province, Iran. At the 2006 census, its population was 27, in 8 families.

References 

Populated places in Amol County